This is a list of fellows of the Royal Society elected in 1689.

Fellows 
Joseph Raphson  (d. 1716)
Nicolaus Witsen  (1641–1717)
George Moult  (d. 1727)
William Stanley  (1647–1731)

References

1689
1689 in science
1689 in England